Sunae-dong (수내동, 藪內洞) is a Bundang neighborhood in the city of Seongnam, Gyeonggi Province, South Korea. It is officially divided into Sunae-1-dong, Sunae-2-dong  and Sunae-3-dong.

It is served by Sunae Station on the Bundang Line.

Bundang
Neighbourhoods in South Korea